His and Her Christmas is a 2005 television film directed by Farhad Mann and starring Dina Meyer and David Sutcliffe. It first aired on December 19, 2005, on Lifetime.

Plot
The film features the rivalry between two San Francisco Bay Area newspapers and their main writers, both of whom are single with their friends and family constantly trying to set them up with that special someone.

Tom Lane is the star columnist for the fictional San Francisco Sun, a newspaper owned by a media conglomerate. The Sun owners are thinking about increasing Tom's exposure by producing a new television show around him.  Meanwhile, Liz Madison is the advice columnist for the Marin County Voice, a small community newspaper which is a throwback to gentler times, but struggling with circulation.

On November 2, the staff at the Voice learn that the Sun ownership has bought their newspaper, with the probable goal of folding it into the operations of the Sun, meaning the staff at the Voice will lose their jobs.

To fight back, Liz decides to change her column to an editorial, espousing the meaning of Christmas and the Voice to the community. Liz's feisty and entertaining stance of her new column results in the Voice increasing its circulation so much so that the Sun ownership has second thoughts about folding it.

However, keeping the Voice in circulation would, in turn, put Tom's new television show in jeopardy. To protect his career advancement, Tom decides to write a counterpoint column to Liz's, his about instilling some practicality into Christmas.

The competing columns become a personal battle for the two columnists. But as Tom and Liz spew their mutual loathing for each other, their respective friends try to convince them of the old adage that there is a fine line between love and hate.

Cast
 Dina Meyer as Liz Madison
 David Sutcliffe as Tom Lane
 April Telek as Sarah (as April Amber Telek)
 Kyle Cassie as Elliott
 Alistair Abell as Nick
 Paula Devicq as Vicki Shaw
 Alexia Fast as Jacqui
 Scott Swanson as Billingsley
 Tony Alcantar as Hayden - Stylist
 Scott E. Miller as Clark (as Scott Miller)
 Garry Chalk as Anthony Shephard
 Campbell Lane as Harold Lane
 Karen Khunkhun as Grace Fields
 Suzanne Bastien as Black Woman
 Gigi De Leon as Christina (as Gigi deLeon)

See also 
 List of Christmas films

References

External links
 
  His and Her Christmas at Lifetime's website

2005 television films
2005 films
American Christmas drama films
Canadian Christmas drama films
Canadian drama television films
English-language Canadian films
American romantic drama films
2005 romantic drama films
Lifetime (TV network) films
Films directed by Farhad Mann
Films shot in Vancouver
Films about journalists
Canadian romantic drama films
Christmas television films
American drama television films
2000s American films
2000s Canadian films